is a sub-kilometer asteroid and near-Earth object of the Aten group. It is also a transient Venus co-orbital, and a Mercury grazer as well as an Earth crosser. It was once designated as a potentially hazardous asteroid.

See also

Notes

  This is assuming an albedo of 0.25–0.05.

References

Further reading
 Understanding the Distribution of Near-Earth Asteroids Bottke, W. F., Jedicke, R., Morbidelli, A., Petit, J.-M., Gladman, B. 2000, Science, Vol. 288, Issue 5474, pp. 2190–2194.
 A Numerical Survey of Transient Co-orbitals of the Terrestrial Planets Christou, A. A. 2000, Icarus, Vol. 144, Issue 1, pp. 1–20.
 Debiased Orbital and Absolute Magnitude Distribution of the Near-Earth Objects Bottke, W. F., Morbidelli, A., Jedicke, R., Petit, J.-M., Levison, H. F., Michel, P., Metcalfe, T. S. 2002, Icarus, Vol. 156, Issue 2, pp. 399–433.
 Transient co-orbital asteroids Brasser, R., Innanen, K. A., Connors, M., Veillet, C., Wiegert, P., Mikkola, S., Chodas, P. W. 2004, Icarus, Vol. 171, Issue 1, pp. 102–109. 
 The population of Near Earth Asteroids in coorbital motion with Venus Morais, M. H. M., Morbidelli, A. 2006, Icarus, Vol. 185, Issue 1, pp. 29–38. 
 Asteroid 2012 XE133: a transient companion to Venus de la Fuente Marcos, C., de la Fuente Marcos, R.  2013, Monthly Notices of the Royal Astronomical Society, Vol. 432, Issue 2, pp. 886–893.

External links 
  data at MPC
 List of Potentially Hazardous Asteroids (PHAs)
 
 
 

Aten asteroids
Discoveries by LINEAR
Venus co-orbital minor planets
Venus-crossing asteroids
Earth-crossing asteroids
20010213
Mercury-crossing asteroids